Nicolás Hernán Gonzalo Otamendi (born 12 February 1988) is an Argentine professional footballer who plays as a centre back for Portuguese Primeira Liga club Benfica and the Argentina national team.

Otamendi played for Vélez Sarsfield and Porto in his early career, winning eight major titles with Porto, including three Primeira Liga championships and the 2011 Europa League. He signed for Valencia in 2014 and spent four months on loan to Atlético Mineiro of Brazil. In 2015, he moved to Manchester City and won the Premier League in 2017–18 and 2018–19, as well as four League Cups and an FA Cup.

An Argentina international since 2009, Otamendi represented his country at three World Cups and four Copas América, in which he contributed to consecutive runner-up finishes before winning the fourth attempt in 2021, also lifting the 2022 World Cup, where he played every single minute of Argentina's campaign.

Club career

Vélez
Born in Buenos Aires, Otamendi made his Primera División debut for Club Atlético Vélez Sarsfield on 10 May 2008, in a 2–1 home win against Rosario Central for the Clausura tournament. During manager Hugo Tocalli's spell he was only fifth-choice stopper, behind Waldo Ponce, Fernando Tobio, Marco Torsiglieri and Mariano Uglessich. However, his role in the first team changed during Ricardo Gareca's first season as head coach, the 2009 Clausura: he replaced Ponce for the third game after the Chilean was injured while playing for his national team, and eventually won a starting position alongside Sebastián Domínguez, playing 17 of the 19 games in Vélez's winning campaign.

Otamendi scored his first professional goal during the 2009 Apertura, in a 3–1 victory over Arsenal de Sarandí. During that season he also made his debuts in an international club competition, appearing in the Copa Sudamericana; in recognition of his performances throughout the year he was chosen for the South American Team of the Year, in a traditional continent-wide journalists' poll conducted by the newspaper El País.

Porto

On 23 August 2010, Otamendi was transferred to Portuguese side FC Porto on a €4 million fee, signing a five-year contract. Vélez also retained 50% of his registration rights, with the player having a pre-set price of another €4 million to be met by Porto prior to September 2011. He netted in his first match, a 2–0 home victory over S.C. Olhanense, finishing his first season with 15 appearances and five goals (notably both in a 2–0 away win against S.C. Braga) as the northerners won the Primeira Liga championship.

On 6 September 2011, Porto exercised the rights to sign the remainder of Otamendi's playing rights. He played 30 official games during the season to help the club to another two major titles, notably the back-to-back domestic league.

Valencia

On 5 February 2014, Otamendi was sold to Valencia CF in La Liga for €12 million, on a five-year contract starting on 1 July. He was immediately loaned to Clube Atlético Mineiro in Brazil, and played 19 times for the team from Belo Horizonte, scoring once to open a 4–1 win at city rivals América Futebol Clube (MG) on 23 March in the first leg of the semi-finals of the state championship.

Otamendi made his debut in the Spanish top level on 23 August 2014, starting in a 1–1 away draw against Sevilla FC. He scored his first goal for his new club on 4 October, helping to a 3–1 home success over Atlético Madrid.

On 4 January 2015, Otamendi headed Valencia's winner in a 2–1 home win over Real Madrid, ending their opponents' club record 22-match winning streak as a result. After helping Los Che qualify for the UEFA Champions League for the first time in four years, becoming the first club stopper to score six goals in the league in the process, he was the only player from his team to be named in the La Liga Team of the Year.

Manchester City
Late into the 2015 pre-season, Otamendi refused to train or play with Valencia to avoid thwarting his chances of signing with another club. On 20 August, he joined Manchester City on a five-year deal for a fee of £32 million. He made his debut on 15 September, coming on as a 75th-minute substitute for Vincent Kompany in a 1–2 home loss against Juventus for the Champions League group phase; his Premier League debut came four days later, in a 1–2 defeat to West Ham United at the City of Manchester Stadium.

On 31 October 2015, Otamendi scored his first goal for the club in a 2–1 home win over Norwich City. He played the full 120 minutes as they won the Football League Cup on 28 February 2016, defeating Liverpool on a penalty shootout in the final.

On 10 December 2017, Otamendi scored the winning goal in the Manchester derby at Old Trafford, helping City stretch their lead at the top of the Premier League to 11 points. City would go on to lift the Premier League title that season with a record-breaking 100 points, this was Otamendi's first league title in England. On 18 April 2018, Otamendi was named in the PFA Team of the Year alongside Manchester City teammates Kyle Walker, David Silva, Kevin De Bruyne and Sergio Agüero.

In the 2018–19 season, Otamendi helped Manchester City become the first English side to win a domestic men's treble, consisting of the League Cup, Premier League title and FA Cup.

In his final season at Manchester City, Otamendi made 39 appearances in total. He also helped his side retain the League Cup for the third season in a row in March 2020, his final trophy with City.

Benfica
On 29 September 2020, Otamendi moved to former club Porto's rivals Benfica, signing a three-year contract for a €15 million fee, with Benfica defender Rúben Dias moving to Manchester City for a larger fee as part of the deal. He made his league debut in a 3–2 win against Farense on 4 October. Otamendi was at fault for both of Farense's goals and conceded a penalty during the match. In Benfica's UEFA Europa League group stage clash with Rangers on 5 November, Otamendi received a straight red card in the 19th minute for denying an obvious goal-scoring opportunity; Benfica would fall 1–3 down but eventually earn a 3–3 draw.

International career

In April 2009, Otamendi was called up by Argentina national team coach Diego Maradona for a friendly with Panama. At the time of his selection he had only played 11 professional games, and eventually started the match on 20 May, in a 3–1 win.

During the 2010 FIFA World Cup qualifying campaign, Otamendi played as a centre back alongside Martín Demichelis against Ecuador (0–2 away loss), partnered former Vélez teammate Domínguez against Brazil in a 1–3 home defeat and appeared as a right back in a 1–0 win in Uruguay which sealed the country's qualification to South Africa. On 19 May 2010 he was confirmed as part of the 23-men squad for the final stages, featuring in the starting eleven for the final group stage game against Greece; on the press conference after the match, Maradona said that, in his opinion, he was the best player on the field.

Otamendi also played the 90 minutes of the round-of-16 game against Mexico, which Argentina won by 3–1. His final appearance in the tournament was the 0–4 quarter-final loss to Germany: this time his performance received criticism by the football press, as did his manager's decision to improvise him on the right-back position; however, the player subsequently stated his desire to always play for his national team, even if not in his natural position.

Otamendi scored his first goal for Argentina on 2 September 2011, in a 1–0 friendly win over Venezuela in Kolkata, after heading a corner taken by Lionel Messi. After being cut from the squad that later appeared at the 2014 World Cup, he was selected by coach Gerardo Martino for the 2015 Copa América, playing the entirety of all but one match as they lost 1–4 to hosts Chile on a penalty shootout in the final; he was named in the Team of the Tournament.

Otamendi started all the games in the Copa América Centenario in the United States, in which Argentina again both faced Chile in the tournament final and lost in a penalty shootout, 2–4. In the second group match against Panama, on 10 June 2016, he scored the opening goal in a 5–0 win.

Otamendi was included in Jorge Sampaoli's squad for the 2018 World Cup. On 30 June, he played the entire match as Argentina were eliminated by France after losing 3–4 in the round-of-16.

In June 2021, he was included in Lionel Scaloni's final 28-man squad for the 2021 Copa América. On 10 July, he played the entire match as Argentina defeated Brazil 1–0 in the final to win the Copa América. 

On 1 June 2022, Otamendi played the entire match as Argentina won 3–0 against reigning European Champions Italy at Wembley Stadium in the 2022 Finalissima.

He was included in the Argentina squad for the 2022 World Cup by Lionel Scaloni. On 18 December 2022, in his 100th international cap, he fouled Randal Kolo Muani to give away the penalty for France's opening goal in the final, where Argentina eventually won 4–2 in the penalty shoot-out after the match ended 3–3 at extra-time, to win the World Cup.

Career statistics

Club

International

Scores and results list Argentina's goal tally first, score column indicates score after each Otamendi goal.

Honours
Vélez
Argentine Primera División: 2009 Clausura

Porto
Primeira Liga: 2010–11, 2011–12, 2012–13
Taça de Portugal: 2010–11
Supertaça Cândido de Oliveira: 2011, 2012, 2013
UEFA Europa League: 2010–11
Taça da Liga runner-up: 2012–13

Manchester City
Premier League: 2017–18, 2018–19
FA Cup: 2018–19
Football League/EFL Cup: 2015–16, 2017–18, 2018–19, 2019–20
FA Community Shield: 2018, 2019

Benfica
Taça de Portugal runner-up: 2020–21

Argentina
FIFA World Cup: 2022
Copa América: 2021
CONMEBOL–UEFA Cup of Champions: 2022

Individual
South American Team of the Year: 2009
O Jogo Primeira Liga Team of the Year: 2012 
La Liga Team of the Season: 2014–15
Copa América Team of the Tournament: 2015, 2016
PFA Team of the Year: 2017–18 Premier League

References

External links

Profile at the S.L. Benfica website
Argentine League statistics at Fútbol XXI 

1988 births
Living people
Argentine people of Basque descent
Footballers from Buenos Aires
Argentine footballers
Association football defenders
Club Atlético Vélez Sarsfield footballers
FC Porto players
Valencia CF players
Clube Atlético Mineiro players
Manchester City F.C. players
S.L. Benfica footballers
Argentine Primera División players
Primeira Liga players
La Liga players
Campeonato Brasileiro Série A players
Premier League players
UEFA Europa League winning players
Argentina international footballers
2010 FIFA World Cup players
2015 Copa América players
Copa América Centenario players
2018 FIFA World Cup players
2019 Copa América players
2021 Copa América players
2022 FIFA World Cup players
Argentine expatriate footballers
Argentine expatriate sportspeople in Portugal
Argentine expatriate sportspeople in Spain
Argentine expatriate sportspeople in Brazil
Argentine expatriate sportspeople in England
Expatriate footballers in Portugal
Expatriate footballers in Spain
Expatriate footballers in Brazil
Expatriate footballers in England
Copa América-winning players
FIFA World Cup-winning players
FIFA Century Club